Shane Lee Yaw (born July 19, 1988), better known as Shane Dawson, is an American YouTuber, actor, filmmaker, writer, and musician. One of the first people to rise to fame on YouTube, he began making videos in 2008 at the age of 19 and garnered over 500 million views during the next two years.

Most of Dawson's early work consisted of comedy sketches in which he would play original characters, impersonate celebrities, and make light of popular culture. Some of these impressions later drew criticism for their offensive content, including racial stereotypes. He has released six original songs such as "Superluv!" and numerous parodies of popular music videos. In 2013, he started the podcast Shane and Friends, which ran for 140 episodes over four years. In 2014, he directed, produced, edited, and starred in the romantic comedy film Not Cool and appeared on the accompanying docu-series The Chair. He has also appeared in the horror film Smiley (2012) and the comedy film Internet Famous (2016).

In 2015, Dawson began discussing conspiracy theories on his YouTube channel, which led to his 2019 web series Conspiracy Series with Shane Dawson. In 2017, he released his first docu-series on YouTube, in which he reconciled with his absent father. From 2019 to 2020, he created and appeared in the docu-series The Beautiful World of Jeffree Star, which garnered over 130 million views. His most viewed docu-series are about Jeffree Star, Jake Paul, and TanaCon.

Dawson has released two New York Times best-selling books, I Hate Myselfie (2015) and It Gets Worse (2016), and his three YouTube channels have collectively accumulated over 4.5 billion views. Since 2017, he has updated only his main channel, which has over 20 million subscribers and over 4 billion views. In June 2020, YouTube indefinitely suspended monetization on all three of his channels and his books were pulled from shelves following a public backlash over numerous controversial comments he had made in the past, particularly regarding underage girls and zoophilia. He took a hiatus and returned to YouTube on October 7, 2021.

Early life
Dawson was born Shane Lee Yaw in Long Beach, California, on July 19, 1988. He has two older brothers named Jacob (born 1980) and Jerid (born 1985), with whom he grew up in a low-income household headed by their single mother, Teresa. He was educated in Lakewood, California, graduating from Lakewood High School in 2006. He was bullied for his weight in school, and his brothers helped him during these times; he later lost . He first became interested in making videos when he would hand in videos for school projects with his friends.

Career

2008–2010: YouTube, ShaneDawsonTV
On March 10, 2008, Dawson made his YouTube channel, called "ShaneDawsonTV". The earliest video that remains on the channel, "Kermit the Frog and Me" was uploaded about 4 months later. When he first began making videos, he worked at Jenny Craig along with his mother and brother, but was fired in August 2008 after he uploaded a video of himself pole dancing in the building he worked at and for showing before-and-after photos of clients, saying that "all these people gain their weight back." The video also included clips of his co-workers reading inappropriate passages of a book by Jenny Craig spokesperson Valerie Bertinelli. His mother, brother and about six other coworkers who appeared in the video also were fired after the company saw the video. In September, he uploaded a video called "Fred is Dead!", which has since received over 25 million views. During this time, Shane performed as a number of "drug-addled, often drunk, cultural stereotype characters" in his skits, including: "ghetto girl" Shanaynay, “Ned the Nerd”, gangster “S-Deezy”, “Barb the Lesbian”, a football jock/bully (who is a closeted homosexual), the jock’s insecure girlfriend (who thinks she’s overweight), a “fashionably bulimic” high school girl (whose finger is her “best friend” to aid in self-induced vomiting), “Aunt Hilda” (portrayed with a thick “New York-Jewish” accent), gothic girls, “trans” characters, and “Guadalupe”/“Fruit Lupe” (a Mexican with stereotyped chola accent). 

Dawson would also, in skits where he was playing himself, portray either fictional or exaggerated versions of his own “relatives” and family members. One video sees Dawson pretending to still be an adolescent student, and the struggles of feigning “illness” to avoid attending school for a day. The same video sees him wearing a bright-red wig, red lipstick and matching red bathrobe to portray his “mother”, an alcoholic, “Southern”, lazy and semi-abusive character. When she forces Dawson to attend school, she sends him out the door by saying “Later, f*ggot!” Despite Dawson’s own bisexuality and homosexual marriage, these instances of gay slurs drew some criticism at the time; his actual mother (who later appears in several videos) bears no comparison to this character. He also drew some criticism for portraying a pre-op transgendered male-to-female character, who appeared in a skit about speed dating; the bulk of the character’s appearances consisted of such lines as “I’m sick of this penis! Chop it off!” and explaining “…and that’s how they’re going to turn my penis into a clitoris.” At that point, Dawson (portraying himself) is seen turning to the side and vomiting, profusely.

Dawson occasionally posts new videos on his channel "ShaneDawsonTV" (mainly short web films, music video parodies, film trailer parodies, and original music) and formerly posted other videos on his second channel "ShaneDawsonTV2", now called "Human Emoji" however the use of this channel has mostly been discontinued as of 2012. His third and main YouTube channel, Shane, is where he previously posted vlogs, and now posts original content Mondays through Fridays. He began using this channel in May 2010. Shane often collaborates with other YouTubers or appears in their videos, such as Joey Graceffa, BrittaniLouiseTaylor, TheFineBros, Trisha Paytas, iJustine (real name Justine Ezarik), Tyler Oakley, Miranda Sings (a character created by YouTuber, comedian, singer and actress Colleen Ballinger), Sawyer Hartman, Drew Monson and others. In November 2009, Dawson was featured on Attack of the Show!. In 2010, Forbes magazine named him their 25th most famous web celebrity.

2010–13: Television pilots and music career
On August 11, 2010, Dawson announced that he was making a 30-minute pilot called SD High. Previously, the funding he needed for the pilot was provided by digital media group Take180 after he helped them out with acting in their own videos. The pilot is based on two videos which Dawson uploaded to his main channel in Summer 2010. The story centered around a teenage boy in school and his interactions with the other characters. The pilot's release date was set towards the end of September 2010 on his main YouTube Channel, however Dawson later announced that he had been contacted by a television studio to produce the pilot for their TV channel(s).

According to Dawson, there is some uncertainty involving the pilot, however it may be a TV show in the future. On March 26, 2011, Dawson uploaded a video to YouTube explaining to his audience that he was working with Happy Madison Productions, Sony Pictures, and some other YouTubers including TheFineBros and BrittaniLouiseTaylor to create the television show.
In January 2012, Dawson stated in a video that he was now working on a new television show, which would be semi-based on his life working at a Weight Loss center. He stated that he would be pitching the show soon, and that he was "really excited" for it, and stated the show was "kind of like Arrested Development, but – not." On May 16, 2012, Dawson revealed in a vlog that he was working on a comedy-horror film, explaining that he wanted to write "something like a teen comedy", however that the film would be "scary and fun". Dawson revealed in November 2012 that he was in negotiations to direct a feature-length film. In 2012, Dawson revealed in a vlog that he was working on a music project. In March 2012, Dawson revealed that his debut mainstream single, "Superluv!" would be released that month. The song was released on March 31, 2012, on iTunes, with an accompanying music video debuting on his YouTube channel on the same day. The song managed to chart at 87 in Ireland, 16 on the UK Indie Chart, 163 on the UK Singles Chart and reached the 28th spot on the US iTunes Pop Chart.

On May 8, 2012, Dawson revealed in a video that he has begun working on his next original song, which is tentatively titled "The Vacation Song". He previewed about 10 seconds of the "rough edit" of the song, and stated that he was going to change the mood of the song, saying, "Right now, it's a little too happy, because it's a break up song. I want it to be more like Kelly Clarkson's 'Since U Been Gone'." He stated that the song would "hopefully" be released by the beginning of June 2012. The song was released on June 23, 2012, with the music video being released a week later.
In October 2012, a film called Smiley was released to theaters starring Dawson. In December, Dawson released a new single entitled "Maybe This Christmas". On February 5, 2013, Dawson recorded a single titled "F**K Up". The song was released on YouTube and iTunes on March 30, 2013. On October 18, 2013, Dawson released a song entitled "Wanna Make Love To You", with Liam Horne. Dawson does not actually provide vocals to the song, but iTunes credits him as one of the artists.

2013–2016: Shane and Friends, The Chair, and books
In June 2013, Dawson started a podcast entitled Shane and Friends. As of 2013, Dawson revealed that he was pitching a talk show and was continuing to pitch the series about him working at a weight loss center. On November 12, 2013, Dawson announced that he was developing the weight loss center project with Sony Pictures Television for NBC. The project has been titled Losin' It and, if picked up, would be a half-hour single-camera comedy series focusing on a successful former-client at a weight loss center who decides to share his inspiration by becoming a consultant at the center, and subsequently becomes the manager by the end of his first day. Darlene Hunt, Will Gluck, Richie Schwartz, Lauren Schnipper, and Dawson would serve as executive producers for the project.

On April 4, 2014, Dawson announced that he had directed and starred in a comedy film in Pittsburgh earlier that year. The film, which was made on a $800,000 budget, was released September 19, 2014. On June 26, he announced that the film would be titled Not Cool. It was part of a Starz original series called The Chair, in which two novice directors are given the same script and must each make their own film from it. People who watched both films then voted online to vote for the films. Not Cool competed against Anna Martemucci's Holidaysburg. Zachary Quinto, producer of The Chair, called Dawson's film "deeply offensive" and "tasteless", and that Dawson should not be making films at all, removing his name from the film in disgust. Dawson defended his film by saying that "I like the movie. The producers that I trust like the movie. The test audience liked the movie. I know I deserve to make a movie because I've been working my f***ing ass off these last eight years on YouTube." Dawson won the competition, winning the $250,000 prize to work on another film project.

In December 2014, Dawson released a parody of Taylor Swift's song "Blank Space" on YouTube. This video was found to be in poor taste by her labels, Big Machine Records and Sony, who removed it, citing "copyright infringement". Dawson subsequently claimed that the parody was removed because Sony objected to the video's violent content. The video was restored in February 2015.

In early 2015, Dawson released a memoir titled I Hate Myselfie: A Collection of Essays. The memoir was released by Atria Books/Keywords Press, an imprint of Simon & Schuster.

In July 2016, Dawson released another memoir entitled It Gets Worse: A Collection of Essays. It was released by Atria/Keywords Press.

2017–2020: YouTube series
In 2017, the focus of Dawson's channel has shifted to include a wider variety of video genres such as extended vlogs, conspiracy theory videos and documentary-style series where he collaborates with other YouTubers like fiancé Ryland Adams, Garrett Watts, Morgan Adams, Tana Mongeau, James Charles, Drew Monson, Andrew Siwicki, Trisha Paytas and Bunny Meyer.

In June 2018, Shane uploaded a three-part documentary series titled The Truth About TanaCon, about the TanaCon convention, the company who organized the event—Good Times, ran by talent manager Michael Weist—and the effects the disastrous event had on fans. The series received tens of millions of views in one week and garnered significant media attention. In August 2018, Shane continued the documentary format and covered makeup artist Jeffree Star in a five-part series titled The Secret World of Jeffree Star and also received high amounts of media attention Dawson interviews and experiences a day in the life with Internet celebrity, makeup artist, model, entrepreneur, and singer-songwriter Jeffree Star, learning about his business Jeffree Star Cosmetics. In September 2018, Shane covered YouTuber Jake Paul in an eight-part series titled The Mind of Jake Paul. The series follows Dawson's investigation on the lifestyle of Paul, including research with licensed therapist Katie Morton on antisocial personality disorder. Later in the series, Dawson is invited into the Team 10 house, and interviews Jake about his controversial career. Dawson was criticized for his documentaries The Mind of Jake Paul and The Secret World of Jeffree Star, with some arguing that Dawson was too sympathetic towards the racism scandals of both subjects.

In January and February 2019, Shane released a two-part series on conspiracy theories titled Conspiracy Series with Shane Dawson. The first part included theories on the Apple FaceTime glitch, deepfakes, subliminal messages in cartoons, Hollister, Walt Disney, the Woolsey Fire and Camp Fire. The second part featured Dawson investigating further topics, exploring the wider message "don't believe everything you see", including Adobe Voco voice manipulation, and Chuck E. Cheese pizzas. Dawson has been criticized for his conspiracy theory content, as some feel that his videos about the flat Earth, moon landing hoax, and 9/11 hoax conspiracy theories, among others, contribute to YouTube's widespread issues with misinformation. In July 2019, Dawson returned to YouTube for a one-hour long documentary video titled The Return of Eugenia Cooney about Internet personality Eugenia Cooney. Earlier in the year, Cooney announced that she would be taking a break from social media to focus on her health.

In October 2019, Dawson released The Beautiful World of Jeffree Star, which follows Dawson and Star as they plan and design a new makeup and merchandise collection called The Conspiracy Collection.

Personal life
Dawson began dating YouTuber Lisa Schwartz in December 2011. He came out as bisexual in July 2015 and confirmed that he had separated from Schwartz. He began dating YouTuber Ryland Adams in 2016, and they became engaged on March 19, 2019. Having previously lived in Calabasas, California, he moved in August 2021 to Colorado, where he and Adams purchased a farm for $2.2 million.

On January 3, 2023, Dawson and Adams married in Colorado.

Dawson has discussed his experiences with body dysmorphic disorder.

Controversies
Dawson has been criticized for his racial comedy, particularly his use of blackface in several past skits, his use of the word "nigga" in multiple videos, and his jokes about "ghetto pranks" at the 2012 VidCon. In September 2014, YouTuber Franchesca Ramsey and other bloggers criticized Dawson for his past actions. He later apologized for the jokes in a video, stating that he viewed the controversy as a "learning experience". Many of his past performances relied on caricatures of people of color and other minorities, and he used blackface to portray Wendy Williams and Chris Brown in some skits, leading to allegations of racism.

In 2018, Dawson was the subject of a controversy regarding comments he had made about pedophilia on a 2013 episode of his podcast Shane and Friends, after which he published an apology video likening his comedic style at the time to that of shock jocks. The same comments were also the subject of a controversy in March 2019, coupled with more controversy regarding comments he had made on a 2015 episode of the same podcast about engaging in sexual activity with his cat.

On June 26, 2020, Dawson responded to criticism of his racial comedy by posting a 20-minute video in which he addressed renewed criticism for his use of blackface, the word "nigga", and other offensive comments he made since launching his YouTube channel. Although he had apologized publicly before, Dawson claimed he had only recently realized how "those apologies suck" and that he didn't "know who that person is anymore". He further remarked how he "should have been punished for things" and how "finally just [owning] up to all of this and [being] accountable is worth losing everything" to him. Dawson also apologized to James Charles, whom he had described as "egocentric" and "power hungry" just a week before. He concluded his apology video by vowing to better his "actions", but said he understands if people do not want to accept his apology or no longer support him. He also claimed that he dealt with the pain from his childhood by making inappropriate jokes: "It is something I did for shock value or because I thought it was funny. It's all gross and I promise that that is not real; that is not me." Hours after his apology was posted, musician Jaden Smith accused Dawson of sexualizing his sister Willow Smith, expressing how he was "disgusted" after an old video resurfaced of Dawson pretending to masturbate while looking at a poster of Willow, who was 11 years old at the time. Jaden and Willow's mother Jada Pinkett Smith also told Dawson that she was "done with the excuses".

On June 29, 2020, Target announced that it was "in the process of removing" Dawson's two published books I Hate Myselfie and It Gets Worse from its shelves. On June 30, YouTube indefinitely suspended monetization on all three of Dawson's channels.

Filmography

Film

Television

Web

Podcasts

Discography

Singles

Bibliography
 I Hate Myselfie (2015)
 It Gets Worse: A Collection of Essays (2016)

Awards and nominations

|-
| 2010
| Streamy Awards
| Best Vlogger
| rowspan="6" | Himself
| 
|
|-
| 2010
| Teen Choice Awards
| Choice Web Star
| 
|
|-
| 2011
| Teen Choice Awards
| Choice Web Star
| 
| 
|-
| 2017
| People's Choice Awards
| Favorite YouTube Star
| 
| 
|-
| rowspan="2" | 2017
| rowspan="2" | Streamy Awards
| Creator of the Year
| 
| rowspan="2" | 
|-
| Best First Person Channel
| 
|-
| rowspan="4" | 2018
| rowspan="4" | Streamy Awards
| Collaboration
| "Switching Lives With A Blind Person", with Molly Burke
| 
| 
|-
| Creator of the Year
| Himself
| 
| rowspan="3" | 
|-
| Documentary
| The Truth About Tanacon
| 
|-
| Editing
| The Truth About Tanacon, with Andrew Siwicki
| 
|-
| 2018
| People's Choice Awards
| The Social Star of 2018
| Himself
| 
| 
|-
| 2019
| The Shorty Awards
| YouTuber of the Year
| Himself
| 
|

Notes

References

External links

 
 

Shane Dawson
1988 births
21st-century American comedians
21st-century American singers
21st-century American male singers
American conspiracy theorists
American directors
American male comedians
American male writers
American YouTubers
Beauty and makeup YouTubers
Bisexual male actors
Bisexual musicians
Blackface minstrel performers
Comedians from California
Comedy YouTubers
Fullscreen (company) people
YouTube controversies
Bisexual comedians
LGBT film directors
American LGBT singers
LGBT people from California
LGBT YouTubers
Living people
Male actors from Long Beach, California
Male actors from Los Angeles
Music YouTubers
Shorty Award winners
Streamy Award winners
YouTube vloggers
20th-century American LGBT people
21st-century LGBT people
American LGBT comedians